Dyke Action Machine! or DAM! is a public art and activist duo made up of designer Carrie Moyer and photographer Sue Schaffner. DAM! gained notoriety in the 1990s for using commercial photography styling with lesbian imagery in public art.

History 
Sue Schaffner and Carrie Moyer formed Dyke Action Machine! (DAM!) in 1991 in New York City. They met when in 1990 working together in Queer Nation, splitting from the group in 1991 because they saw a need of lesbians in particular. DAM!'s name was chosen to signal "that lesbians had their own particular set of oppressions and social conditions - separate from gay men - that needed attending to." DAM! specifically targeted lesbophobia, the marginalization of lesbians not only in favor of heterosexuality but also within LGBT circles, where Schaffner and Moyer saw the male homosexual as privileged.

The duo created radical feminist public art, putting images of lesbians into commercialized styles and settings. Together with groups like Guerilla Girls and Toxic Titties, DAM! resisted sexism and consumerism. DAM! has been described as intentionally pluralistic, embracing many identities and issues.

With Schaffner's experience as a commercial photographer and Moyer's work as a designer and painter, the duo captured and created images reminiscent of commercial advertising but delivered messages that raised the profile of lesbians. This material was then placed where ads were typically seen, such as bus stops, telephone booths, and construction site barricades. DAM!'s method of presenting lesbian activist art in typically commercial landscapes creates an effect described by some as "slick subvertising" and "agit-prop". Schaffner and Moyer remained anonymous for eight years, signing their work only with Dyke Action Machine!. Among their influences for their work were Gran Fury, Barbara Kruger, and Fran Winant. The duo is mainly active in the New York City area, although their work has been shown internationally and they make some available to be downloaded and distributed by anyone.

The work of Dyke Action Machine! is held at the Cooper-Hewitt National Design Museum. It has been included in anthologies and encyclopedias of queer and lesbian art, where their work has been discussed alongside LGBT artist activists Chloe Atkins, Kay Shumack, Marion Moore, Jill Posener, the Australian Word of Mouth Collective. In 2000, Schaffner and Moyer won a Creative Capital award for visual arts to create Gynadome: A Separate Paradise.

The GAP Campaign 

DAM!’s first poster project, released in June of 1991, purpose was to expose the lack of lesbian representation in American popular culture. These politicized posters were intended to be read as advertisements fitting seamlessly into a commercialized streetscape. The project consisted of 500 posters placed all over the city of New York - on mass transit busses and payphone kiosks - highlighting the fact that for one to “exist” or be visible in mainstream media, one must belong to a recognizable consumer group. The campaign replaced the photos of mostly-unknown celebrities featured in the GAP ads with pictures of obviously queer lesbians. The GAP Campaign critiques lesbian invisibility as well as tackling the psychology of advertising.

Exhibitions 
 1993: SILENCE=DEATH Munchner Stadtmuseum, Munich and Hygiene-Musem, Dresden, Germany 
1993: Kunst und AIDS International AIDS Conference, Berlin, Germany
1994: Amendments Hallwalls, Buffalo, New York
1994: Becoming Visible: The Legacy of Stonewall New York Public Library, New York, New York
1995: In a Different Light University Art Museum, Berkeley, California
1995: You Are Missing Plenty if You Don't Buy Here: Images of Consumerism in American Photography Frances Lehman Loeb Art Center, Vassar College, Poughkeepsie, New York
1995: Copy-Art Oldenburg University, Oldenburg, Germany
1996: Mixing Messages: Graphic Design in Contemporary Culture Cooper-Hewitt National Design Museum, catalog, Manhattan, New York
1996: Gender, Fucked Center on Contemporary Art, Seattle, Washington
1996: Portraiture White Columns, New York, New York
1996: Counterculture: Alternative Information from the Underground Press to the Internet Exit Art/The First World, New York, New York
1997: Vraiment: Féminisme et Art Le Magasin-Centre National D'Art Contemporain de Grenoble, catalog, France
1997: Revolution Girl-Style Messepalast/Museumquartier, catalog, Vienna, Austria
1997: Patriotism The Lab, San Francisco, California
1999: Gender Trouble (Unbehagen der Geschlechter) Neuer Aachener Kunstverein, Aachen, Germany
2000: The Biggest Games in Town Künstlerwerkstatt Lothringer Strasse, Munich, Germany
2000: The Color of Friendship Shedhalle, Zürich, Switzerland
 2002: Straight to Hell: 10 Years of Dyke Action Machine! Yerba Buena Center for the Arts, Berkeley, California; Diverseworks, Houston, Texas
2002: Queer Commodity Mount Saint Vincent University Art Gallery, Halifax, Nova Scotia
2003: Ameri©an Dre@m: A Survey Ronald Feldman Fine Arts, New York, New York
2003: Illegal Art: Freedom of Expression in the Corporate Age CBGB's 313 Gallery, New York, New York; San Francisco Museum of Modern Art (SFMOMA) Artist Gallery, San Francisco, California
2004: Republican Like Me Parlour Projects, Brooklyn, New York
2005: Twofold: Collaborations on Campus Richard L. Nelson Gallery and Fine Arts Collection, University of California, Davis, California
2006: When Artists Say We Artists Space, New York, New York
2008: Reclaiming the "F" Word: Posters on International Feminisms California State University, Northridge, California
 2008: Break the rules! Mannheimer Kunstverein, Mannheim, Germany

References

External links 
 Dyke Action Machine! website

1991 establishments in New York City
Feminist artists
Lesbian feminism
Lesbian culture in New York (state)
LGBT art in the United States
American LGBT artists
Women in arts occupations